"Twistin' Postman" is a song recorded by Motown singing group The Marvelettes, who released it in 1961, and was the follow-up to their smash debut single, "Please Mr. Postman".

Background
Like their previous single, the vocals are led by original Marvelette Gladys Horton, and is partially based on the then-current Twist dance move. The song's subject is a sequel of the original "Postman" single and this time the narrator is finally happy that the postman has delivered a letter from the narrator's boyfriend.

Credits
Lead vocals by Gladys Horton
Background vocals by Wanda Young, Katherine Anderson, Georgeanna Tillman and Juanita Cowart
Instrumentation by The Funk Brothers

Chart performance
The song became a modest hit for the group reaching number thirteen on the R&B charts,  and number thirty-four on the pop singles chart in early 1962. A third single, "Playboy", returned the group to the top ten of the pop and R&B charts later that year.

References

Songs about occupations
Songs about letters (message)
Twist (dance)
1962 singles
The Marvelettes songs
Tamla Records singles
Songs written by Brian Holland
Songs written by William "Mickey" Stevenson
1961 songs
Songs written by Robert Bateman (songwriter)